The 1938 United States Senate election in Pennsylvania was held on November 8, 1938. Incumbent Republican U.S. Senator James J. Davis was re-elected to a second term in office over Democratic Governor George Howard Earle III.

General election

Candidates
James J. Davis, incumbent U.S. Senator (Republican)
George Howard Earle III, Governor of Pennsylvania (Democratic)
David H.H. Felix (Socialist)
Reginald B. Naugle (Pathfinders)
Pat Toohey (Communist)
Furest S. Van Valin (Prohibition)

Results

References

1938
Pennsylvania
United States Senate